Yuying Li is a Chinese-Canadian professor of computer science in the David R. Cheriton School of Computer Science at the University of Waterloo in Canada. Her research interests include mathematical optimization, scientific computing, data mining, and tail risk in computational finance.

Education and career
After earning a bachelor's degree in mathematics in 1982 from Sichuan University, Li completed a PhD at the University of Waterloo, in 1988. Her dissertation, An Efficient Algorithm for Nonlinear Minimax Problems, was supervised by Andrew Conn.

She worked as a researcher at Cornell University before returning to Waterloo as a faculty member.

Recognition
Li was the 1993 winner of the Leslie Fox Prize for Numerical Analysis.

References

External links
Home page

Year of birth missing (living people)
Living people
Chinese computer scientists
Canadian women computer scientists
Canadian computer scientists
Sichuan University alumni